Anna Kostka (1575–1635) was a Polish–Lithuanian noblewoman.

Anna was the daughter of Jan Kostka and Zofia Odrowąż, and related to Saint Stanislas Kostka. She married Aleksander Ostrogski in 1592. She inherited the city of Jarosław as well as several other areas after her mother.

After being widowed in 1603, she lived an independent life as the manager of her own and her children's dominions. She benefited the university of Jarosław, introduced the Benedictine order to the city, protected the Jesuits, commissioned several later famed art objects for the churches and became known for her charity toward the poor.

References
 Halina Kowalska, Ostrogska z Kostków Anna, Polski Słownik Biograficzny, T. XXIV

1575 births
1635 deaths
Anna
16th-century Polish women
17th-century Polish women
17th-century Polish landowners
17th-century women landowners